The Lazzaro Spallanzani National Institute for Infectious Diseases is an infectious disease hospital in the Italian city of Rome. The institute is named for the eighteenth-century Italian biologist Lazzaro Spallanzani.

It is the Italian national reference center for Ebola patients.

During the COVID-19 pandemic, the Spallanzani Institute was the first research centre in Europe to isolate the genomic sequence of SARS-CoV-2 and upload it to GenBank.
The team was composed of Maria Rosaria Capobianchi, Francesca Colavita, and Concetta Castilletti.

The institute is working with biotech company ReiThera to test a COVID-19 vaccine candidate called GRAd-COV2, which is based on a modified gorilla adenovirus vector.

References

External links 
 http://www.inmi.it/

Hospitals in Rome
Rome Q. XII Gianicolense
Biosafety level 4 laboratories
Medical research institutes in Italy